Olsynium junceum is a species of the iris family, native to South America (Bolivia, Peru, Argentina, Chile).

Subspecies
 Olsynium junceum subsp. colchaguense (Phil.) J.M.Watson & A.R.Flores - central Chile
 Olsynium junceum subsp. depauperatum (Phil.) R.A.Rodr. & Martic - southern Chile
 Olsynium junceum subsp. junceum - Bolivia, Peru, Argentina, northern + central Chile

References

Sisyrinchieae
Flora of South America
Plants described in 1827